Tommaso A. Dragani is an Italian genetic epidemiologist whose research is focused on understanding the genetic control of complex phenotypes.  

Results from his studies allowed the chromosomal mapping of quantitative trait loci (QTLs) modulating the genetic predisposition to liver, lung and skin tumorigenesis, in animal models.  His population-based studies resulted in the identification of genetic polymorphisms associated with the risk and prognosis of lung cancer. He contributed to discovering the mechanism underlying the association between polymorphisms in nicotinic acetylcholine receptor subunit genes on chromosome 15 and the risks of lung cancer and nicotine dependence.  He contributed with a genome-wide study to the pharmacogenomics of pain relief in response to opioid therapy for cancer pain.

Biography 
Dragani was born in Ortona, Italy, and studied pharmacy at the University of Bologna where he received and MPharm degree in 1977.

In 1998, Dragani was appointed Director of the Genetic Epidemiology and Pharmacogenomics Research Unit at the National Cancer Institute in Milan. In 2007 he achieved a Masters in Medical Statistics and Statistical Methods in Epidemiology by the University of Milan.

Achievements 
Tommaso A. Dragani identified genetic loci that influence the hereditary predisposition to liver cancer (Cancer Res. 1993;53:209-11), lung cancer (Nat Genet. 1993;3:132-6; Nat Genet.1996;12:455-7), and skin cancer (Oncogene. 2000;19:5324-8). He characterized genes involved in the hereditary predisposition to lung cancer in mice and identified genetic loci that modulate the expression of these genes (PLoS Genet. 2014;10:e1004307; Cancer Lett. 2016;375:221-230).

He conducted a genome-wide association study (GWAS) between genetic polymorphisms and lung cancer (J Clin Oncol. 2006;24:1672-8). He demonstrated that polymorphisms in the CHRNA5 gene promoter modulated the transcription of this gene, and thereby showed that genetic variants affected the risks of lung cancer and nicotine dependence (J Natl Cancer Inst. 2010;102:1366-70; Carcinogenesis. 2013;34:1281-5).

He did a GWAS  on pain relief in cancer patients treated with opioids, demonstrating that different genetic loci control the individual response to this therapy (Clin Cancer Res. 2011;17:4581-7).

He discovered the tumor-promoting activity of 1,4-bis[2-(3,5-dichloropyridiloxy)]benzene (TCPOBOP), a constitutive androstan receptor agonist ( [12] and he characterized carcinogenicity of 2,3,7,8-tetrachlorodibenzo-p-dioxin (TCDD).

Memberships 
Tommaso A. Dragani participated as a member of International Working Groups on cancer research.
In particular, he was Member of six IARC Monographs Working Groups on the Evaluation of Carcinogenic Risks to Humans.

He, also, served as a Member of the International Lung Cancer Consortium (ILCCO), an organization that aims to share data from ongoing lung cancer case-control and cohort studies, in particular regarding genetic association studies. The overall objectives are to reduce duplication of research effort, replicate novel findings, and afford substantial cost savings through large collaborative efforts.

Publications 
Tommaso A. Dragani published more than 180 peer-reviewed articles.
His H-index is 40 (ResearchGate) and he has a ResearchGate score of 44.77.

He is author of Human Polygenic Diseases: Animal Models.

See also
Renato Talamini

References 

Italian oncologists
Living people
Italian epidemiologists
Year of birth missing (living people)
University of Bologna alumni
University of Milan alumni
People from Ortona
Cancer epidemiologists
Italian medical researchers
20th-century Italian scientists
21st-century Italian scientists